This list of challenge awards is an index to articles about notable challenge awards, or inducement prize contests.
A cash prize is given for the accomplishment of a feat, usually of engineering.

Offered before 1900

Offered in 20th century

Offered in 21st century

See also

 Inducement prize contest
 Space elevator competitions
 Competitions and prizes in biotechnology
 Data science competition platform
 Lists of awards

References

 
Challenge